My Internship in Canada is a Canadian political satire film written and directed by Philippe Falardeau. The film premiered in 2015 at the Locarno International Film Festival.

The film was nominated for four Canadian Screen Awards, and won three awards at the 18th Quebec Cinema Awards. It was also part of the Canada's Top Ten screening series of the 2015 Toronto International Film Festival.

Plot 
The film stars Patrick Huard as Steve Guibord, an independent, moderate Member of Parliament for the northern Quebec electoral district of Prescott–Makadewa–Rapides-aux-Outardes, who unexpectedly finds himself in the position of becoming the tie-breaking voter on whether Canada will go to war in the Middle East. Embarking on a tour of his constituency to evaluate public opinion, various lobby groups and Canada's Prime Minister spin the debate farther and farther out of control.

Guibord's confusion and eventual national tour is documented by Souverain (Irdens Exantus), his Haitian immigrant intern, who often calls his mother (and an increasing audience of passers-by) with updates on the ever-increasing situation.

Cast 
 Patrick Huard as Steve Guibord
 Irdens Exantus as Souverain Pascal
 Suzanne Clément as Suzanne
 Clémence Dufresne-Deslières as Lune
 Sonia Cordeau as Stéphanie Caron-Lavallée
 Paul Doucet as the Prime Minister of Canada
 Jules Philip as Maire
 Dangelo Néard as Optimiste
 Robin Aubert as Rodrigue
 Ellen David as Allison
 Micheline Lanctôt as Mairesse
 Alexis Martin as Advisor to the Prime Minister of Canada
 Paul Ahmarani as Professor Amin

Production 
The film was shot from 24 September to 10 November 2014 in Val-d'Or, the Abitibi-Témiscamingue region, Ottawa, and Haiti.

Accolades 
The film had its North American premiere at the 2015 Toronto International Film Festival, where it received an honourable mention from the Canadian film jury. It was released in the province of Quebec on 2 October 2015, on seven screens, with a wide release in the province on 9 October 2015.  In December, the film was announced as part of TIFF's annual Canada's Top Ten screening series of the ten best Canadian films of the year. In January 2016 it won the Canada's Top Ten Film Festival People's Choice Award, voted on by audiences in Toronto.

The film garnered four Canadian Screen Award nominations at the 4th Canadian Screen Awards in 2016, including Best Picture, Best Supporting Actor (Irdens Exantus), Best Original Screenplay (Philippe Falardeau) and Best Sound (Bernard Gariépy Strobl, Daniel Bisson, Claude La Haye and Benoît Leduc). For the 18th Quebec Cinema Awards (formerly known as the Prix Jutra), it won Best Supporting Actor (Exantus), Best Original Score and Best Editing.

It was shortlisted for the Prix collégial du cinéma québécois in 2016.

References

External links 
  (Quebec)
  (international)
 

2015 films
English-language Canadian films
Films directed by Philippe Falardeau
Canadian political satire films
Films shot in Quebec
Films set in Quebec
Films shot in Haiti
Films set in Haiti
Films shot in Ottawa
French-language Canadian films
2010s Canadian films